The Cincture of the Theotokos is believed to be a relic of the Theotokos (Blessed Virgin Mary), now in the Vatopedi monastery on Mount Athos, which is venerated by the Holy Eastern Orthodox Church. The word "cincture" (Greek: zone) is sometimes also translated as "belt", "sash" or "girdle".  It is the Orthodox equivalent of the Girdle of Thomas in the Western church, and the Syriac Holy Girdle. Its feast day is September 13.

Tradition
According to the Sacred Tradition of the Eastern Orthodox Church, at the time of her Dormition, the Theotokos was buried by the Twelve Apostles in Jerusalem. Three days later, Thomas the Apostle, who had been delayed and unable to attend the funeral, arrived and asked to have one last look at the Virgin Mary. When he and the other apostles arrived at Mary's Tomb, they found that her body was missing. According to some accounts, the Virgin Mary appeared at that time and gave her belt (cincture) to the Apostle Thomas. 

Traditionally, the cincture was made by the Virgin Mary herself, out of camelhair.

Location and changes

The history of the cincture prior to the reign of Justinian in the sixth century is unknown. It was kept at Jerusalem for many years, until it was translated to Constantinople in the 5th century, together with the Robe of the Virgin Mary, and deposited in the Church of St. Mary at Blachernae. This relic was embroidered with gold thread by the Empress Zoe (d. 899), the wife of Emperor Leo VI, in gratitude for a miraculous cure.

During the reign of Emperor Manuel I Komnenos (1143–1180) in the 12th century, an official feast day for the cincture was established on August 31 on the Orthodox liturgical calendar.

Later, the Emperor John VI Kantakouzenos (1347–1355) donated the cincture to the Holy Great Monastery of Vatopedi on Mount Athos, where it remains to this day, in a silver reliquary of newer manufacture which depicts the Monastery.

Public veneration abroad

Russia

In the fall of 2011, the venerated object was brought to Russia to allow Russian Orthodox Christian pilgrims to reverence it in different cities. In St.Petersburg it attracted a 2 km-long line of people to the Resurrection Nunnery on Moskovsky Prospect virtually blocking automotive traffic on adjacent streets, totalling 200,000, with Vladimir Putin being among the first ones. The second city was Yekaterinburg where about 150,000 people from nearby territories came, including regional governor Alexander Misharin. The next cities were Norilsk (50 thousand, a quarter of Taymyr Peninsula population) and Vladivostok, the further voyage is planned until the end of November.

See also
Monastery (nunnery) of Kato Panagia Xenia on Mount Othrys in Magnesia, Greece, where part of the cincture is held since 1522

References

External links

The Placing of the Cincture (Sash) of the Most Holy Mother of God Orthodox synaxarion and icon

Eastern Christian liturgy
Eastern Orthodox Mariology
Christian relics
Marian apparitions
Belts (clothing)
Mount Athos